BWM or bwm may refer to:

 Best worst method, a multi-criteria decision-making method
 BWM, the DS100 code for Berlin-Wilhelmsruh station, Berlin, Germany
 BWM, the IATA code for Bowman Municipal Airport, North Dakota, United States
 BWM, the Indian Railways station code for Bhawani Mandi railway station, Rajasthan, India
 bwm, the ISO 639-3 code for Mundugumor language, Papua New Guinea